A California Christmas is a 2020 Christmas film directed by Shaun Paul Piccinino, written by Lauren Swickard and starring Swickard, Josh Swickard and Amanda Detmer. A sequel, A California Christmas: City Lights was released 16 December 2021.

Plot 
Joseph Van Aston lives a carefree life and is the son of a wealthy San Francisco real estate tycoon (his mom). He spends his time womanizing and enjoying his rich lifestyle. His mom sends him to Petaluma to close a deal to buy a dairy farm that has continuously refused a buyout to purchase the land. Callie Bernet is a hardworking and headstrong woman, whose farm is more valuable to her than any monetary value, despite being heavily in debt. She lives on the ranch with her mother Wendy, who has cancer, and her little sister Hannah.

Joseph arrives at the farm and meets Callie, who is busy with a cow giving birth to a calf. He is mistaken for the new ranch hand Manny who is set to arrive soon, and assists Callie with the birth. He decides to take advantage of this in an attempt to gain Callie's trust, and despite no experience on a farm, continues to pose as Manny.

Meanwhile, Joseph sends his butler Leo to find the real Manny and pay him not to show up at the farm. Manny capitalizes on the situation by making lavish requests in return for his silence. Manny stays at an Airbnb with Leo, where they pamper themselves, play video games, and drink fine wine throughout the day. Leo finds that Manny has an uncanny ability to determine every note in the wines. Manny also provides farming advice to Joseph, who is in over his head.

Over time Joseph becomes more adept on the farm and grows closer to the Bernet family. Joseph and Callie soon develop feelings for each other and Callie shows Joseph a small abandoned vineyard on the property—left behind by Callie’s late father. She occasionally gifts (but does not sell) the previously bottled wine, and they end up sharing part of a bottle.

As Christmas approaches, Joseph attempts to tell Callie the truth about who he is, but never finds the right moment. He also continually ignores his mother's calls for a status update on the ranch deal. Joseph’s mother takes matters into her own hands and comes to the ranch, fully exposing the con, and pressures Callie to accept the deal to pay off her mother's extensive medical bills. Callie refuses the offer and kicks out Joseph, though Joseph stands up to his mother and pleads to help save the ranch.

Leo and Manny taste the wine from the ranch from the leftover bottle Joseph had and realize it's one of the best wines they've ever tasted. The three of them bring the wine to a prominent wine expert and the wine expert agrees on the quality. Joseph goes back to the abandoned vineyard on his own and helps spruce up the area. Callie finds him working on the vineyard and although still angry at him, works with him to make the vineyard presentable. The wine expert visits the vineyard and ends up purchasing the remainder of Callie's father's wine in the cellar and also leases the existing vines for the future. With the purchase and future commissions from sales, it is enough to keep the ranch in Callie's hands.

Joseph secretly fixes up Callie's old barn and a Christmas / saving-the-ranch celebration takes place, where Callie eventually forgives him and they reconcile. Sometime in the future, Joseph and Callie are sitting on a bench in the now thriving vineyard. Wedding rings are visible on their hands.

Cast

Production 
Filming took place in Petaluma, California over a three and a half week period and both cast and crew had to follow strict COVID requirements. The film marked Lauren Swickard's production and screenwriting debut.

Reception
Common Sense Media rated the film 3 out of 5 stars. Markos Papadatos of Digital Journal was favorable, stating that overall the film was "a pleasant and heartwarming movie on Netflix."

The film was Netflix's top film in the United States upon its release.

Sequel 
Plans for a sequel were announced in December 2020, shortly after the release of the first film. Filming took place during July 2021, once again in Petaluma, and locations included Hermann Sons Hall and Keller Street CoWork. Lauren and Josh Swickard both return for the sequel, along with David Del Rio and Ali Afshar.

The sequel, A California Christmas: City Lights released in December 2021. Markos Papadatos of the Digital Journal was favorable in their review.

See also
 List of Christmas films

References

External links
 
 

2020 comedy films
2020 films
English-language Netflix original films
2020s Christmas comedy films
American Christmas comedy films
Films set in San Francisco
Films directed by Shaun Piccinino
Films produced by Daniel Aspromonte
Films produced by Ali Afshar
Films produced by Lauren Swickard
Films with screenplays by Lauren Swickard
2020s English-language films
2020s American films